Mark Johnson may refer to:

Entertainment
Mark Johnson (musician) (born 1955), American banjoist
Mark Johnson (producer) (born 1945), American film producer
Mark Steven Johnson (born 1964), American film director and writer
Mark Johnson, played officer Luke Everett in In the Heat of the Night
Mark Johnson, creator of the multimedia music project Playing For Change

Politics
Mark Johnson (North Carolina politician) (active from 2016), American attorney, educator, and politician
Mark Johnson (Oregon politician) (born 1957), American politician
Mark Johnson (Minnesota politician), American lawyer, businessman and member of the Minnesota Senate
Mark Johnson (Ohio politician), Ohio state representative

Sports

Baseball
Mark Johnson (baseball coach), Texas A&M Aggies, Sam Houston State Bearkats 
Mark Johnson (catcher) (born 1975), former professional baseball catcher
Mark Johnson (first baseman) (born 1967), former professional baseball first baseman
Mark Johnson (pitcher) (born 1975), former Major League Baseball pitcher
Mark Johnson (umpire) (1950–2016), professional baseball umpire

Other sports
Mark Johnson (announcer) (born 1966), British horse racing announcer
Mark Johnson (basketball), American basketball coach
Mark Johnson (boxer) (born 1971), American boxer
Mark Johnson (cricketer, born 1963), American cricketer
Mark Johnson (Yorkshire cricketer) (born 1958), former English first-class cricketer
Mark Johnson (curler) (born 1958), American-Canadian curler from Edmonton, Alberta
Mark Johnson (footballer) (born 1978), Australian rules footballer
Mark Johnson (golfer) (born 1954), American professional golfer
Mark Johnson (ice hockey) (born 1957), American gold medal winner at 1980 Winter Olympics
Mark Johnson (rugby league) (born 1969), South African wing
Mark Johnson (wrestler), American former Greco-Roman wrestler and coach
Mark "Slick" Johnson, professional wrestling referee

Other 
Mark Johnson (philosopher) (born 1949), philosophy professor
Mark H. Johnson, developmental neuroscience professor
Mark W. Johnson, co-founder of Innosight
Mark A. Johnson, American physical chemist
Mark Johnson, chief meteorologist for WEWS-TV

See also
Marc Johnson (disambiguation)
Mark Johnston (disambiguation)